Cape Breton East (formerly Sydney River-Mira-Louisbourg) is a provincial electoral district in  Nova Scotia, Canada, that elects one member of the Nova Scotia House of Assembly.  The riding is represented by Brian Comer of the Progressive Conservative Party.

In 1925, the County of Cape Breton and neighbouring Richmond County were divided into three distinct electoral districts, one of which was named Richmond-West Cape Breton. In 1933, on the recommendations of the 1932 Electoral Boundaries Commission, Richmond-West Cape Breton was dissolved and two new districts were created, one of which was Cape Breton West, which also took in parts of Cape Breton Centre and Cape Breton East.  In 2003, this district had minor adjustments to its boundaries with Cape Breton South, Cape Breton Centre, and Glace Bay. It gained the area on the north side of East Bay along highway 216 to include Eskasoni First Nation. In 2013, following the recommendations of the 2012 Electoral Boundaries Commission, the district was renamed Sydney River-Mira-Louisbourg. It gained the Mira Road, Sydney River, Prime Brook, and Coxheath areas from Cape Breton South, as well as a section of Grand Lake Road from Cape Breton Nova. It lost the area northwest of East Bay to Victoria-The Lakes and the area southwest of Portage and Sandfield and west of the Mira River to Cape Breton-Richmond.

The riding was renamed Cape Breton East for the 2021 Nova Scotia general election.

Members of the Legislative Assembly
This riding has elected the following Members of the Legislative Assembly:

Election results

Cape Breton East

Sydney River-Mira-Louisbourg

Cape Breton West

References

Summary of Official Results by District (2013 election). Elections Nova Scotia, retrieved November 25, 2013.

External links
 2013 riding profile

Nova Scotia provincial electoral districts
Politics of the Cape Breton Regional Municipality
2012 establishments in Nova Scotia